Stratone rufotestacea is a species of beetle in the family Cerambycidae. It was first described by Thomson in 1864.

References

Heteropsini
Beetles described in 1864